Mentha x villosa (syn: Mentha alopecuroides, Mentha nemorosa, Mentha villosa var. alopecuroides) is a hybrid species of mint, a cross between Mentha spicata and Mentha suaveolens.

The mint is traditionally used as a core ingredient in Cuba in the famous Mojito, where it is known as yerba buena or hierbabuena. (the drink is often made with spearmint outside of Cuba)

Description

The rhizomes are wide-spreading and fleshy, and bear fibrous roots.

Cultivation

Mentha x villosa grows best in moist soil and part-full sun.

The variety was not commonly available outside of Cuba until about 2005, when it became commercially available in North America.

References

Antiemetics
Herbs
villosa
Hybrid plants